is a Japanese manga series written and illustrated by Karuho Shiina. It was published by Shueisha in Bessatsu Margaret from 2005 to 2017 and collected in 30 tankōbon volumes. In 2008, it won the Best Shōjo Manga award in the 32nd Annual Kodansha Manga Award. The series was also nominated for the first Manga Taisho awards in 2008. Two anime adaptations of Kimi ni Todoke were aired in Japan, produced by Production I.G. The second season of the anime was announced in Betsuma Magazine, began airing in Japan on January 4, 2011, and lasted for 12 episodes. A live action film adaptation was released in 2010 starring Mikako Tabe and Haruma Miura. A live-action series produced by TV Tokyo and Netflix is set for a March 2023 release.

Plot
The story takes place in Hokkaido. 15-year-old high school freshman Sawako Kuronuma—dubbed Sadako by her classmates for her resemblance to the character from The Ring—has always been feared and misunderstood because of her appearance. Rumors around school report that she can see ghosts and curse people. However, despite her ominous appearance, she is actually a sweet and unassuming girl who only longs to be helpful. She has been shunned for so long that the idea of making friends has become foreign to her. When a popular boy, Kazehaya, begins talking with her, everything changes. She finds herself in a new world, making new friends and talking to different people, and she can't thank Kazehaya enough for giving her these opportunities. Slowly, but surely, a sweet love blossoms between the two as they overcome circumstances and obstacles standing in their way.

Characters

Sawako, the main protagonist, is a high school girl in search of friendship, but her resemblance to the horror film character Sadako Yamamura made this difficult. Her unhealthy levels of modesty and ineffective communication skills has prevented her from correcting misconceptions. As a result, she was tragically ostracized by everyone she met, and has forgotten how to understand others and express herself. Despite these obstacles, she remains a pure, positive, and caring person who works hard in everything she does.

On the day of the entrance ceremony at Kitahoro High School, Amira meets Zeqree under cherry blossoms by chance and helps him find his way. Due to his friendly and broad-minded nature, he is the first person she is able to smile genuinely and get through as herself. Her world begins to change as she learns to communicate her feelings and form closer friendships with fellow human beings, especially Chizuru Yoshida and Ayane Yano, for the first time.

She is rather petite - a characteristic inherited from her father, who is only 160 cm tall (however, by the end of the series, she is taller than him) - but is surprisingly fast, to the point some people believe she has teleportation powers. She takes everything people say so very seriously and tends to over-analyze situations. When she is deep in thought, her dark appearance terrifies her peers. With her pacifist nature and protectiveness nature, she sacrifices herself for others, when she avoided Ayane, Chizuru, and even Shōta, to protect their reputations. Though on top of academics, Sawako is oblivious socially awkward, often scolded by Shōta and Chizuru for putting herself down and avoiding others was normal.

Amira is forever grateful to Zeqree for giving her the opportunities to make friends and initially idolizes him. Thanks to her rival Ume Kurumizawa and Ryu Sanada explaining what the feelings of romantic love are, she realizes she is actually in love with him. Working through various misunderstandings, she eventually finds the courage to confess to him during the school festival during her second year, and they finally become a couple. Later in the same year when Zeqree acts distant towards her for months due to his own insecurities, Sawako openly questions their relationship and cries and yells at him for neglecting her. This snaps him back to his senses, and they get their relationship back on track.

During her third and final year, Sawako begins to ponder for the first time what she wants to do in the future. With the help of her homeroom teacher Pin Arai, Sawako discovers her wish to pursue her innate ability of teaching, particularly in Japanese Language (the reason is because it is her worst subject, but challenges her improve her communication skills). Ultimately, she decides to leave her hometown and attend a Sapporo Educational University along with Ume, who becomes her best friend. By the end of high school, Sawako finally is able to clear up the misconceptions of her as "Sadako" by her class, graduating with a positive note. Bidding Ayane and Chizuru heartfelt farewell, and retaining a strong long-distance relationship with Shōta, she receives a ring from him on her 18th birthday and a letter the day she leaves with promises for the future.

Some time later, Sawako returns to her hometown after graduating from university, and reunites with and hugs Shōta at the place where they first met.

 
Shōta is Sawako's friendly classmate, and initially her idol. His popularity is so widespread regardless of gender because of his refreshing exterior. However, Shōta himself does not believe he is refreshing. With a serious, honest personality and his father's inherited stubbornness and temper, Shōta follows his own inflexible ideals and does not mindlessly follow the crowd. Though he treats everyone equally and without any bias, this is because he keeps a certain distance between himself and others, excluding those who he regards as familiar and trustworthy. In Sawako's case, he regarded her existence as special to him from the beginning.

Shōta's family owns a sportswear store, and his father is a baseball coach. He has known his best friend Ryu Sanada and Chizuru Yoshida since elementary school. Ever since he was a young boy, Shōta was on his father's baseball league team, and played along with Ryu on the middle school baseball team. However, due to his strained relationship with his father, and his mother's failing health, Shōta quit playing baseball in High School "before he could hate it", a decision disappointed his homeroom teacher Pin, and angered his father. Thus, he does not belong to any club in high school, though still attends Pin's morning practices.

When he sees Sawako smile on the day of the entrance ceremony, Shōta immediately feels a need to get to know her better. Willing to look past false rumors about her, Kazehaya is able to see who Sawako truly is, and feels a deep admiration for her strength, optimism and kindness. Early on he recognizes these are feelings of romantic love, though is unaware she feels the same way. Despite her gratefulness towards him, Shōta is unassuming about the impact he has on her, believing Sawako is able to stand up and make everything possible with her own willpower, regardless of the circumstances, the very thing he had always wanted to be able to do.

During his second year, Shōta begins to feel depressed when Sawako does not give him chocolates on Valentine's Day, unaware she had been too nervous to give him any. Attempting to work through the misunderstandings plaguing them, he eventually confesses to her during the school festival, promising to always take care of her. After, she confesses her own feelings, and they become a couple. Later, Shōta begins to avoid Sawako for many months because of his own fear of not being the refreshing persona he believes Sawako is in love with, unconsciously causing a rift in their relationship. It is only after Sawako deems him a liar for ignoring her, does he realizes not facing his fear was his mistake, and they get their relationship back on track.

Shōta's relationship with his father throughout the series is sour, as he believes Shōta is irresponsible and dependent on others. As a result, Shōta is constantly trying to prove to his father he can be independent. Although initially deciding to succeed his family's store, Shōta thinks again about what he wants to do, and decides to return to baseball as a sports trainer and inherit the store at the same time. He ends up taking the entrance examination of the department of sports science at a local university. With the final full confidence, he is able to make his own decisions, and he makes amends with his father.

Some time later, Shōta returns to the place where he first met Sawako after graduating from university, and reunites with and hugs Sawako at the place where they first met.

 
Ayane is a close friend of Sawako's and part of Kitahoro's advanced school program. She is fashionable and noted to look mature for her age. An intelligent tactician, Ayane is easily able to decipher people's intentions and use them to her advantage. On the other hand, she gives just enough information to leave enemies and friends alike wondering and thus, force them forward. Generally, Ayane is strong-willed and caring, but also calculating and cold.

From a young age, Ayane was cautious academically and socially, easily giving up and never striving beyond her abilities. Retaining an aloof demeanor, she was a social recluse who hated being around others. Though once the captain and setter of her middle school volleyball team, after a sticky incident where she was shunned by her team, she quit before the last tournament and moved to a different high school (Kitahoro).

During freshman year, she makes her first true friends, Chizuru Yoshida and Sawako Kuronuma. Admittedly, they are the only people she has ever extended a hand to outside her immediate family, for they were the first to inspire her with their sincerity and courage. Fiercely loyal to them, she often takes up the role of an elder sister who supports and advises them. However, even with them, Ayane does not confide her own worries or intimate details, preferring to not make them worry about her.

Though appearing to be a self-assured individual, Ayane is actually quite shy. She suffers from an aversion to taking risks and striving towards her dreams like her friends. For this reason, she envies them and has severe lack of self-esteem, thinking of herself as a cruel coward. However, Pin affirms she is nice, surprising her.

During her second year, a schoolmate named Mogi confesses to her, and she agrees to date him, but their relationship instantly falls apart when she realizes he was just using her. Despite her many romances, Ayane has never actually fallen in love. Kento Miura comforts and forms a crush on her, and though Ayane is not in love with him, she is moved by his sincerity and agrees to date him.

Throughout her senior year, Ayane struggles with what she wants to do when she graduates, and it is ultimately Pin who drives and encourages her, personally believing in her potential to become tremendously successful. As they spend more time together and he sheds his usual rambunctious image to seriously advise Ayane, she realizes he saw through her from the beginning. Ayane begins to admire him as a teacher and an individual, cherishing every piece of advice and encouragement he had ever given her.

Ayane's longtime dream has been to get into a prestigious university in Tokyo and eventually go overseas, but Kento expresses his disapproval and wishes for her to attend a university in Sapporo with him. Though Kento is the first boyfriend who truly cared for her, Ayane is unable to fall in love with him in the long run. Eventually Ayane realizes she will never get anywhere if she doesn't take responsibility for her own actions. No longer wishing to take the easy path, she decides she wants to challenge herself by pursuing her dream, and breaks up with Kento on mutual terms, though they remain good friends.

While studying for the university exams, Ayane finally realizes she is in love for the first time, with none other than Pin. Due to their nearly 10-year age gap and roles as teacher and student, she does not expect him to return her feelings, or ever see him again after graduating. Still, thanks to Sawako and Chizuru's encouragement, she summons the courage to confess her feelings and passing university result to him on Valentine's Day. As expected, he rejects her confession as "10 years too early", but praises her as a kind person. Applauding not only her academic efforts, but her growth as a person, Pin lets Ayane know he believes in her future and encourages her to have more self-confidence. Tearfully smiling, Ayane thanks Pin for everything he has done for her and aspires to become an amazing adult who doesn't shame him in 10 years.

On the day she leaves for Tokyo, she meets Sawako and Chizuru for the last time at the train station and exchanges heartfelt farewells with them, thanking them for always supporting her and vowing to remember them anytime she felt like giving up and do her best. By the finale, Ayane is shown to have gained self-confidence, beaming when a few of her university classmates compliment her as "kind".

 
Chizuru is another close friend of Sawako and Ayane and in Kitahoro's basic school program. Her nickname is "Chizu". Out of the 4 heroines, she is the tallest and most athletic, boasting a streak of 99 victories wrestling guys in middle school. Though not very feminine, she likes wearing miniskirts and sports shorts to accent her legs. Because of her tomboyish appearance, she has often been mistaken for a former Yankee since childhood.

Her personality is fearless and hot-blooded, with a strong sense of duty and justice. Unlike Sawako and Ayane, Chizuru is extremely loud, brash, and talkative, always ready to speak her mind. She is cheerful with a large amount of fortitude enabling her to show courage in the face of adversity. Despite her intimidating nature, Chizuru has an unexpected sentimental side, often crying out of fear, frustration, anger, humiliation, or even comical effect. Not one of the brightest students, a running gag throughout the series and she is constantly having classes during school breaks to make up her failed academic assignments. Additionally, she is often oblivious to her surroundings and insensitive to the feelings of others.

Chizuru is also a big fan of Ramen, as shown when she wrote she would like to study it in her career questionnaire, and Ayane once joked about Chizuru was ramen in a previous life. Her favorite ramen shop is "Tetsuryuken", run by her childhood friend and neighbor Ryu Sanada's father, and she eventually ends up working there.

Before high school, her only friends were boys, particularly Ryu Sanada and Shōta Kazehaya, who she went to the same middle school with. From a young age, she was in love with Ryu's older brother Tōru Sanada, although he had only ever seen her as a little sister. All the while, Chizuru was clueless to Ryu's own romantic affections for her, only seeing him as a little brother.

As their parents are close, Chizuru's relationship with Ryu goes back to the time they were toddlers. While they were in 3rd grade, Ryu's mother Tetsuko Sanada tragically died in a car accident and Tōru had to leave Ryu and his father for college in Sapporo. Chizuru comforted Ryu and vowed to be by his side forever as his sister. It would be upon this promise their relationship akin to siblings would be founded until Ryu confessed his romantic feelings to the horrified 17 year-old Chizuru.

At the freshman entrance ceremony, Chizuru first meets Ayane Yano, and later on in the year Sawako Kuronuma. Although her relationship with the two starts off rocky, after understanding both, she takes an instant liking to them. The two become such close friends to Chizuru to the point where she threatens Kurumizawa Ume to "say whatever you want about me, but don't talk about them like you know them!"

Near the end of the year, Tōru returns from Sapporo with a new fiancée named Haruka Katayama. Chizuru goes through her first heartbreak. This leads to her having a conflict with Ryu on his birthday, who wanted her to realize her love was futile from the beginning. However, after Chizuru and Ryu are able to resolve their differences on the issue, their friendship is strengthened.

But during her second year, Chizuru suddenly finds the nature of her relationship with Ryu tested. While on a school trip to Okinawa, she hears from Joe Sōichi Ryu rejected a girl because he is in love with another girl. Chizuru begins to feel jealous Ryu never told her who he liked, and starts questioning his trustworthiness. When the girl who was rejected confronts Chizuru and tells her to stay away from Ryu if they are not in a romantic relationship, Chizuru becomes furious and yells at her to mind her own business. This fight leaves Chizuru visibly shaken and feeling anger and awkwardness towards Ryu.

During the trip, Ryu finally confronts her about his romantic feelings. Chizuru is horrified and rejects him on the spot. From this moment on, she finds herself unable to see Ryu as her brother, and can only see him as a distant stranger. Both aware they can no longer go back to the way they were in the past, they end their long and treasured friendship. The anguished Chizuru finally breaks down in tears when the class returns to Hokkaido, wondering if their friendship was only built out of Ryu's feelings and never existed from the beginning.

Throughout the year, Chizuru does not interact with Ryu, but shows uncomfortable emotional outbursts whenever he is mentioned. When Christmas arrives, both Chizuru and Ryu attend their class party and talk to each other again after a long while. Chizuru awkwardly gives him a baseball wristband as a present. Ryu gives her a pink rose, something he says reminds him of her. Chizuru is left confused over her feelings for Ryu.

During senior year, Chizuru starts thinking about what she wants to do in the future and decides to work part-time at Tetsuryuken. Unexpectedly, Ryu reveals to her on Valentine’s Day he plans to leave their town to pursue his dream of playing baseball at a Sapporo university. The two become even more distant. Deeply saddened, Chizuru realizes she has begun to see Ryu as a man and does not want him out of her life.

On her 18th birthday, Ryu thanks Chizuru for always supporting him from childhood, and promises her he will succeed in baseball. At this, Chizuru bursts into tears and asks him not to go, confessing her realized romantic feelings for Ryu. As they sort out the issue together as a couple, Chizuru begins to understand her bond with Ryu will never die no matter where he goes. Eventually, she finds the strength to support his dreams again.

After graduating from high school, Chizuru bids Sawako and Ayane heartfelt farewell. She decides to work full-time at Tetsuryuken, and she and Ryu make a promise to marry and run it together after he returns from university one day.

 
Ryu is also member of Sawako's group of friends. He is the son of the ramen shop owner of Chizuru Yoshida's favourite ramen shop. He is quiet most of the time and rarely talks, but still can communicate well with Sawako, as they both don't talk much anyway. Ryu and Kazehaya became friends when they were on the baseball team during middle school. He later confirms his love when he confesses that he likes Chizuru to Sawako. While his love is one-sided, he is very patient with Chizuru realizing that Chizuru probably won't like him in a romantic sense, at least not right away. He's more than willing to comfort Chizuru if she's depressed, though he would rather have her mad at him as he knows Chizuru can vent out her emotions better. Ryu also seems to like animals a lot; when Shōta was going to walk "Maru", his adopted puppy, home with Sawako, Chizuru pulled Ryu away telling him he's going to walk with Ayane and her instead. While being pulled away from Shōta's puppy, he cried out for it. A running gag in the series is that he has a very hard time remembering a person's name (with the exception of Kazehaya and Chizuru as he's known them for a long time, and after some time later Sawako and Ayane). In chapter 43, he casually tells Chizuru that he loves her and she is totally shocked. However, in chapter 59, he truly confesses his love for her, but she replies saying, "I have never looked at you in that way". In response, he smiles and says, "I know". After graduating from high school, he attends a university in Sapporo to play baseball and made a promise with Chizuru to marry and run Tetsuryuken together after returning from university one day.

 
Arai is the temporary homeroom teacher for Sawako's class, taking over when the previous homeroom teacher became sick during the summer holidays while Sawako was helping him. Sawako, being formal, always refers to him as "Arai-sensei", while almost everyone else refers to him by his nickname, "Pin". Pin is a great fan of baseball as well as the school baseball team's coach. He used to be part of Kazehaya's father's league team, so he has known Shōta since when he was young. A loud and eccentric man prone to believing the silliest things, Pin apparently enjoys interrupting people. He nicknames the puppy that Sawako and Kazehaya find by the river "Pedro Martínez" after the legendary baseball pitcher, which Sawako suggests be shortened to "Maru". A running gag through the series, despite being a teacher he is prone to actions that are more suited to a teenager, such as eagerly running to the bathroom when he heard about a fight yet became depressed when Sawako and her friends were making up rather than fighting. He and Ayane tend to run into each other a lot, often bickering loudly as they walk away, though on rare occasions he will give her advice (though it comically ends in his ruining the moment to praise himself). He also has a false impression that Sawako is an exorcist. But for how he acts, Arai is rather insightful and is very helpful when it comes to his students, especially when he was suggesting career paths for Sawako, Ayane and Chizuru that best suit their talents and abilities. Pin also has a habit of believing girls in Sawako's year fancy him and often turns them down when they speak to him, stating that he's just too old for them.

 
A girl who appears friendly and sweet to everyone around her, she has had a huge crush on Kazehaya since their first year of middle school; as a result, she understands his personality well, despite the fact they were never close friends. From when she was first seen, for many chapters she was known only as "Kurumi", which Sawako mistook to be her given name. She dislikes her given name, Ume, because it sounds old-fashioned and prefers to be called her nickname, "Kurumi". Kurumi is extremely jealous of Sawako, which led her to spread fake rumors of Sawako's only friends at the time, Yoshida and Yano, using Sawako's name. Kurumi does not attend the same class as Sawako or Kazehaya. During the next series of events it comes out that the middle school "Kazehaya is Everyone's" alliance had been Kurumi's idea, in order to preserve her own chances with Kazehaya. She eventually confesses her love to Kazehaya, but receives an expected rejection. Because she is always surprised with Sawako's naiveté, Kurumi, in her own words, "You just don't get it, do you?! Sawako-chan, when I'm talking to you ... I get irritated and say what I really mean...", and regards her as a rival for Kazehaya's affection. Following Kazehaya's rejection, she becomes colder to her classmates, but is able to finally express her feelings and personality. When Sawako hesitates on expressing her feelings, Kurumi tells Sawako that Sawako is not worthy of being a rival, but changes her mind after hearing that Sawako and Shōta have become a couple. She even defends Sawako against some other jealous girls, and got angry at Miura Kento for saying unnecessary things to Sawako that had caused a rift between Sawako and Shōta. Despite Kurumi's harsh personality, she is deep down, a stubborn, clear minded young woman who had stooped to unfair tricks to win a person's heart but has since learned better.

A student who sits next to Sawako at the beginning of their second year. Miura considers himself fairly popular among the girls, but he immediately expresses an interest in Sawako that Kazehaya becomes a little jealous. Miura assumes Kazehaya likes Sawako because he feels sorry for her, and tries to persuade Kazehaya to not be as involved in Sawako's life. His interference with Sawako and Kazehaya's developing relationship irritates Ayane. He expresses gratitude over the fact that the two began dating before he fell in love with her. In recent chapters, however, it hints that Kento may be developing a sort of attraction for Ayane and has helped her through some difficult times. He tends to help girls with broken relationships, as he continues to grow feelings for Ayane, he seeks advice from Sawako and Kazehaya. It is from Kazehaya that Kento finds out that Ayane has been slapped by one of her ex-boyfriends.

 and 

Endou and Hirano are classmates of Sawako, and also members of her study group. After Sawako begins to open up, Endou and Hirano become some of her first friends and try to find ways to encourage her to be less formal around them. They both become close friends of Sawako, who shows her appreciation of their friendship by making them Christmas gifts in addition to those she makes for her parents, Ayane, Chizuru, and Kazehaya.

One of Sawako's classmates, easily swayed by other people. He generally appears in the background. Jounouchi is very attached to Kazehaya, which usually results in him unwittingly interrupting conversations between Sawako and Kazehaya. At one point, he is rejected after confessing to a girl he liked and is comforted by Kazehaya. After hearing about how Yano broke up with her boyfriend, he sets his attention on her though she is not interested in him. It appears Joe is a character used for comedic value, often blundering with simple tasks or interrupting serious moments. He does not seem to take hints nor does he often realize his mistakes when they are pointed out.

Tōru is Ryu's older brother by eight years and Chizuru's crush since she was young. Although he is Ryu's brother and they resemble one another, their personalities are nearly opposite. Tōru resembles Kazehaya personality-wise and looks extremely refreshing, except much more mature. He lives three hours away from his parents' house but much to Chizuru's surprise, on his visit with the family he introduced his fiancee. He cares about Ryu and Chizuru a lot, and eventually tells Chizuru he loves her like a little sister. He calls Chizuru by the nickname "Chii" because a person has to smile when saying it, and he wanted to cheer her up.

The original home room teacher of Sawako's class. He and Pin have the same surname, but are not related. To distinguish between the two teachers Yoshiyuki Arai is nicknamed "Zen", which is an alternate reading of the kanji for "Yoshi". He seems to be afraid of Sawako and the rumors surrounding her as "Sadako". Early in the series, he falls ill and has to take a leave of absence from school; because of that, students often believe that Sawako has cursed him. Arai is newly-wed and eventually retires from teaching in order to help his wife's family business (a sake brewery), resulting in Pin taking over his class permanently.

The only link to Sawako's past, Shino was her elementary school classmate and the only person who Sawako can openly speak to as the series begins. According to Shiina, Shino was an unnamed character in the manga, but was named by the staff for the anime. In Kindergarten, Shino thought Sawako looked angry, and accidentally called her "Sadako". becoming the catalyst of the many rumors surrounding her. Because of this, Shino feels guilty and personally responsible for Sawako’s problems, and her appearances often consist of her worrying over Sawako and occasionally checking up on whether she is fitting into high school. Shino is in a different class and regrets that she doesn't get to see Sawako very much. She is a cipher, appearing only occasionally as a catalyst for Sawako's interactions with other people. When Sawako finishes her university examinations, Shino checks up on her one more time with an apology and congratulates her on becoming more cheerful and sociable.

A classmate of Sawako, Takahashi sits behind Sawako after the seating arrangements change for the third term of first year. She enjoys teasing Sawako and Ayane remarks that Takahashi is eccentric.
According to Shiina, she was just Takahashi-san in the manga, but has the given name Chigusa in the anime show and from volume 10 onwards.

A classmate of Sawako who sits next to her after the seating arrangements change during the third term of first year. He often consults her on supposedly spiritual or occult concerns.

Mogi is a new character introduced in the recent chapters of the manga. He is a boy from Class 2-B. In Chapter 54, he asks Ayane to date him, to which she immediately agrees. Ayane breaks up with him in Chapter 59.

Media

Manga
Originally planned on being a one-shot to be compiled in her previous work, Crazy For You, Shiina decided to expand the story and make it into a full series. It has been running in Japan in Bessatsu Margaret since the September 2005 issue of the magazine, with 30 compiled volumes as of March 23, 2018. Shiina took a break starting in the March 2009 issue to have a baby; serialization resumed in the October issue. With the release of the September 2017 issue of Betsuma, on August 12, 2017, Kimi ni Todoke entered its final arc. The manga ended in November 2017 and the final volume was released in March 2018. The series is licensed by Viz Media for an English-language North American release. An irregularly published spin-off/sequel manga series, titled  (also a spin-off/sequel of Shiina's other manga Crazy for You), was serialized in Bessatsu Margaret from April 13, 2018 to May 13, 2022 and collected into three volumes.

Light novels
Kimi ni Todoke has been adapted into two series of light novels in Japan released by Shueisha, one under their Cobalt imprint and one under their newer Mirai Bunko imprint. Sixeen volumes have been released in the Cobalt imprint series; the first was released on August 1, 2007, and the last on December 25, 2015. They were written by Kanae Shimokawa, who also novelized the Nana movie and Yūkan Club. Thirteen volumes of the Mirai Bunko version have been released; the first on March 1, 2011, and the last on June 5, 2015. They were written by Kanako Shirai. Both series were illustrated by the author of the original, Karuho Shiina.

A separate volume, also by Kanae Shimokawa, was released on September 11, 2009. The volume took the place of the manga serialization in Bessatsu Margaret magazine while Karuho Shiina took a break due to her pregnancy in 2009; it contains the story of Kazehaya and Sawako's first meeting, before the events of the manga.

Cobalt imprint volumes

Mirai Bunko imprint volumes

Video game
Banpresto released a game for the Nintendo DS in Japan based upon the series on October 16, 2009, entitled . A second Nintendo DS game, also from Banpresto, was released in the Spring of 2011 under the title .

Anime

The first season of the Kimi ni Todoke anime adaptation aired between October 2009 and March 2010. A second season was announced in the November 2010 issue of Betsuma magazine. The second season aired in Japan on NTV in January 2011. Both seasons of the anime are produced by Production I.G. and directed by Hiro Kaburagi. The music is done by S.E.N.S. Project, with the opening sung by Tomofumi Tanizawa and the ending by Chara. NIS America announced at Anime Expo 2011 that they have licensed the first season of Kimi ni Todoke. They released the first season on DVD/Blu-ray on January 10, 2012, and released the second season later that year. NIS America later released the series from Volume 1 through Volume 3 alongside Natsume's Book of Friends seasons 1 and 2 on February 4, 2014. The North American license was passed to Funimation on April 15, 2021.

Live-action film

The February 2010 issue of Bessatsu Margaret (released in January 2010), announced that a live-action film adaptation of the series had been approved. Mikako Tabe and Haruma Miura starred in the film, released in Japanese theatres on September 25, 2010, and directed by Naoto Kumazawa. The Live-action movie was released on Blu-ray and DVD on March 11, 2011.

Live-action series
In September 2022, a live-action television series was announced. The series is a joint production by TV Tokyo and Netflix, and is directed by Takehiko Shinjō and Takeo Kikuchi, with Hayato Miyamoto handling series composition. The series will premiere on March 30, 2023.

Reception

Manga
Volumes of the series commonly ranked in listings of top selling manga in Japan. All the volumes have been translated and published in English.

At the debut of the twelfth volume, all twelve of the current volumes were ranked on Oricon's list of 100 best-selling manga for the week. According to Anime News Network, Kimi ni Todoke is now the "shōjo manga with the most #1 books and the most books to sell one million copies since 2008" in Japan. The series was the third best-selling manga series in Japan in 2010, with 6,572,813 copies sold. As of the release of the 16th volume in May 2012, Kimi ni Todoke will have reached a total of over 20 million copies in print. In 2013, Kimi ni Todoke sold over 3.4 million copies, placing 11th on Oricon's best selling manga series for that year.

Anime News Network called the series "hands down one of the best new English-translated manga series of 2009" and suggested that everyone, not just shōjo manga fans, read the series. The first volume of the series was listed as a "Hot Fall Graphic Novel" for libraries in the teen section by YALSA. The series was also listed in the Best Comics for Teens category of the School Library Journal's Best Comics for Kids in 2009 list. Kimi ni Todoke has also been included on the American Library Association's list of 2010 Great Graphic Novels for Teens.

Live action
According to Oricon, the series was listed as 3rd on a list of titles that Japanese readers wanted a drama adaptation for. The live action movie adaptation opened at second place in Kogyo Tsushinsha's box office chart during its first week in Japanese theaters. The movie was number 3 on Box Office Mojo's chart during its first two days, earning the equivalent to US$2,770,613 on 285 screens.

Anime
Many of the first season volumes have sold well enough in the first week of release to be ranked on the weekly Oricon Sales Chart for Japan's Animation DVDs.

The second season of the anime was number one in a poll of Dengeki Online readers as their most anticipated anime series debuting in January 2011. Anime News Network reviewer Carl Kimlinger gave the second season 4½ out of 5 stars, saying, "This remains the finest series of its type since Lovely Complex, and the most beautiful since...well, I don't know when." Japanese viewers voted it the most enjoyable anime of the Winter 2011 season during a poll taken just before the season ended.

Works cited
 "Ch." and "Vol." is shortened form for chapter and volume and refers to a chapter or volume number of the Kimi ni Todoke manga. Kimi ni Todoke manga volumes by Shiina, Karuho. Original Japanese version published by Shueisha. English translation published by Viz Media.

References

External links

 Official Anime Site 
 Viz series page
 Official Kimi ni Todoke Exhibit in Tokyo 
 

2006 manga
2009 anime television series debuts
2009 Japanese novels
2009 video games
2011 Japanese novels
2023 Japanese television series debuts
Anime and manga set in Hokkaido
Banpresto games
Cobalt Bunko
Coming-of-age anime and manga
Japan-exclusive video games
Japanese television dramas based on manga
Japanese-language Netflix original programming
Light novels
Manga adapted into films
Nintendo DS games
Nintendo DS-only games
Nippon TV original programming
Production I.G
Romance anime and manga
School life in anime and manga
Slice of life anime and manga
Shōjo manga
Shueisha franchises
Shueisha manga
TV Tokyo original programming
Video games developed in Japan
Viz Media manga
Winner of Kodansha Manga Award (Shōjo)